Betal or Vetal (Konkani: वेताळ), (Marathi: वेताळ) a Bhairava form of Shiva is a popular god in Goa, Sindhudurg district & Kolhapur of Maharashtra and Karwar of Karnataka in India. Betal is also known as Vetoba in the Konkan area of Maharashtra and Goa, and in the Sindhudurg district.

Vetoba is a deity of the Shaivites, and also known as Agyavetal, Pralayvetal and Iwalavetal. He holds a sword and a skull bowl.

History
Betal was a deity of people of the Konkan. Betal is a grāmadevatā, a protector deity of the local community.

Vetāla is one of the most famous and popular divine/ semi-divine beings. Almost everyone recognizes him due to the Vetāla-pancaviṁśatī/ Vikrama-Vetāla stories. In Maharashtra, especially in the coastal Konkan region, Vetāla is more popular as the folk deity Vetobā. His nature, appearance, and roles highlight that he is a kshetrapāla or a protector deity.

In purāṇas, he is treated as a Śivagaṇa. They associate him with Bhairava, another Śivagaṇa, who is often glorified as the complete incarnation of Śiva. Bhairava is also worshipped as Bhairobā or Bhairī in Konkan.

Śivapurāṇa (III.21) and Kālikāpurāṇa (Chap.47 onwards) narrate interesting stories of association of Bhairava and Vetāla. As per Śivapurāṇa, once Śiva and Pārvatī were enjoying amorous sports and had appointed Bhairava as the doorman to ensure privacy.

When Pārvatī came out of the room in a dishevelled state, Bhairava happened to look at her ‘like a woman’. He obstructed her from going out, smitten with her charm. This infuriated her and she cursed him to be born as a human[1].

Therefore, Bhairava was born as Vetāla. However, after knowing about this, Śiva did not get furious or curse him any further. Instead, he consoled Bhairava in many ways. After Bhairava was born on the earth as Vetāla, Śiva out of affection for Bhairava took the form of Maheśa and Pārvatī was born as Śāradā[2].

Kālikāpurāṇa extends this story further by adding multiple layers to it. Bhairava is said to be human form of Mahākāla, while Vetāla is the human form of Bhṛṅgī. [3] Mahākāla and Bhṛṅgī, the sons of Hara, were born from two drops of his spilled semen. They were dark black in colour, hence named so. They were appointed as the gatemen by Śiva and Pārvatī, while the couple enjoyed in their bedroom.

When Pārvatī exited the room in a tousled state, they happened to see her. She cursed them for having seen her in a state only fit for her husband to see. She cursed them to be born as humans with monkey faces[4].

Instead of calmly accepting the unjust curse, they hurled a counter-curse; as they were actually innocent, and were diligently doing their assigned duty. It was her fault to walk out of the bedroom in an inappropriate state. She was also to be born as a human, and Hara as her husband. The duo, Mahākāla and Bhṛṅgī was then to be born to them.

Accordingly Pārvatī was born to King Kakutstha and his wife Queen Manonmathinī as Princess Tārāvatī. She was married to Prince Candraśekhara, son of King Pauṣya. Candraśekhara was actually Śiva himself, born to the issueless King through a boon.

Once, when Queen Tārāvatī was bathing in a river, a certain Sage Kapota was enchanted by her beauty, and sought coitus with her. The Queen, afraid of losing her virtue, sent her sister Citrāṅgadā in her stead. This continued for a while. Upon realizing the fraud, the sage cursed her.

As per the curse, a hideous looking, ill-dressed, penniless, and skull-bearing man would forcibly mate with her, resulting in the birth of two monkey-faced sons.

She was furious with such a curse, and vowed that if she was the daughter of Kakutstha, born with the blessings of goddess Caṇḍikā, and was devoted to her husband Candraśekhara, no one apart from her own husband would be able to mate with her.

After she told her husband about the entire episode, he built a secluded tower for her to stay. Once, Śiva and Pārvatī were passing by the tower by air, and spotted her. Realizing this as a befitting opportunity to fulfil all the curses, Śiva instructed Pārvatī to enter the body of Tārāvatī, while he assumed the form of a man, just as was described by the curse of Sage Kapota[5]. Through their union were born two monkey-faced sons.

Later Sage Nārada informed the King about the birth of two princes, and explained their real nature. King then realized his Śivatva and the queen’s Pārvatītva. The kids were named Bhairava and Vetāla.

King later had three more sons with her. He bestowed the kingdom, all the riches, and his love on them; and was rather fearful of Bhairava and Vetāla. They became celibates and wandered about in the forest. In a chance meeting, Sage Kapota explained to them that they actually were the sons of Śiva and Pārvatī.

He sent them to Kāmarūpa to meet their parents. They propitiated Śiva who explained the method of veneration of various forms of Pārvatī. They worshipped her accordingly, and were blessed with permanent servitude to the divine couple, immortality, and divinity. Śiva conferred upon them gaṇeśatva.

The text also goes on to explain their progeny. They were celibates and never married. However, they decided to have sons after a counsel with Sage Nārada, who explained to them the need to have a male offspring[6]. Bhairava was attracted to the divine nymph Urvaśī and produced a son named Suveśa. Vetāla fathered a son named Śṛṅga with Kāmadhenu. These lineages continued to flourish.

Tradition
According to tradition, Betal moves throughout the village at night and keeps vigil on the property of his devotees. The cult of Betal has been very prominent in Goa; animal sacrifices are made to Betal in many places. However, modes of worship differ from place to place. Offerings of sugar and bananas are made, and animal sacrifice is disapproved of in some areas.

Agyo Betal is another form of Betal found in Goa.

In Poinguinim, Goa, when wishes are fulfilled the offering is made in the form of leather chappals. It is believed that Betal wears the chappals and roams around the village. When you visit the temple, you can see the chappals are worn out. Temples are also present in Amona, Pune, Aaravali, Uttarkhand and Kashmir.

Vetal is king of ghosts. The konkan desh is ruled by Vetal and his ghosts. He is worshipped for protection from ghosts. Konkan area is believed to be overpopulated by ghosts and demons. Macchindranath, according to the 5th adhyaya of Navnath Bhaktisaar Granth, made war on the ghosts, Vetal's army was defeated by him over North India and beyond.

See also
Ravalnath
Folk Hinduism

References
{{ Reflist
1.)https://www.gurujimaharaj.com/sivapurana3.html
2. https://www.indica.today/quick-reads/unknown-tales-from-the-puranas-myths-of-vetala-in-the-puranas/

[1] नारीदृष्ट्या पश्यसि त्वं यतो मां पुरुषाधम । अतो भव धरायां हि मानुषस्त्वञ्च भैरव ॥ Śiva III.21.8

[2] तच्छापाद्‍भैरवस्सोथ क्षिताववतरन्मुने । मनुष्ययोन्यां वैतालसंज्ञकश्शङ्करेच्छया ॥

तत्स्नेहतः शिवः सोऽपि क्षिताववतरद्‍विभुः। शिवया सह सल्लीलो लौकिकीङ्गतिमाश्रितः॥

महेशाह्वः शिवश्चासीच्छारदा गिरिजा मुने । Śiva III.21.11-13ab

[3] योऽसौ भृङ्गी हरसुतो महाकालोऽपि भर्गजः। तावेव गौरीशापेन सम्भूय नरयोनिजौ ॥

वेतालभैरवो जातौ पृथिव्यां नृपवेश्मनि । यथा भृङ्गिमहाकालाव्युत्पन्नौ प्राक्तथा श्रुणु ॥ Kālikā 46.8-9

[4] मानुषीं योनिमासाद्य मदवेक्षणदोषतः। भविष्यन्तौ भवन्तौ तु शाखामृगमुखौ भुवि ॥ Ibid 47.14

[5] तस्मिन्काले भवद्‍भर्गः कपाली चास्थिमाल्यधृक् । बीभत्सवेशो दुर्गन्धः पलितोऽतिविरूपधृक् ॥ Kālikā 50.58

[6] पुन्नाम नरकं पुत्रविहीनः परिपश्यति । न तपोभिर्न धर्मेण तन्मोचयितुमीश्वरः॥

केवलात्पुत्रजननात्तस्मान्मोक्षः प्रजायते । तदुत्पादयतां पुत्रं भवन्तौ देवयोनिषु ॥ Kālikā 89.11-12
}}

Bibliography
Vetoba Devasthan of Aravali

Hinduism in Goa
Konkani
Regional Hindu gods
Forms of Shiva